Brec Bassinger (born May 25, 1999) is an American actress. First coming to attention, over 2013–2014, in the recurring role of Emma in The Haunted Hathaways, Bassinger then starred in the lead role of Bella Dawson in the 2015–2016 Nickelodeon series Bella and the Bulldogs. In 2020, Bassinger began playing the titular role in the series Stargirl from DC Universe and The CW.

Early life 
Bassinger was born in Saginaw, Texas. She resides with her mother, while the rest of her family remains in Texas. She used to play basketball, volleyball and run track/field.
Bassinger participated in beauty pageants and was an Our Little Miss World Winner. She has two older brothers named Beric and Brice. Before becoming an actress, she was a competitive cheerleader. She was diagnosed with Type 1 diabetes at the age of 8.

Career 
In 2014, Bassinger was cast in the lead role of the Nickelodeon comedy series Bella and the Bulldogs, which ran for two seasons from 2015 to 2016. In 2016, she joined the cast of the 2018 direct-to-video teen comedy film Status Update. Also in 2018 Bassinger played the role of Roni in the Hulu television series All Night from AwesomenessTV. In 2019, she starred in the thriller film 47 Meters Down: Uncaged.

In 2018, Bassinger was cast in the lead role of Courtney Whitmore/Stargirl in the television series Stargirl, which premiered on DC Universe and The CW in May 2020.

Filmography

References

External links 

  
 

1999 births
21st-century American actresses
Actresses from Texas
American child actresses
American film actresses
American television actresses
Living people
People from Tarrant County, Texas
People with type 1 diabetes